Ioannis Kyriakopoulos (alternate spellings: Giannis, Yiannis, Yannis, Kiriakopoulos) (born June 6, 1983) is a Greek professional basketball player. He is 1.88 m (6'2") in height, and he plays at the point guard position.

Professional career
In his pro career, Kyriakopoulos has played with the Greek Basket League clubs Panionios, AEL 1964, AEK Athens, and Panelefsiniakos.

He was named the Greek 2nd Division Guard of the Year for the 2005–06 season, by the website Eurobasket.com. In the 2013–14 season, he played with Doxa Lefkadas in the Greek National B League (the 3rd level of Greece), and won the B League's north division championship with them.

On September 11, 2020, Kyriakopoulos signed with GS Ermis Shimatariou of the Greek B Basket League.

References

External links
Eurobasket.com Profile
Draftexpress.com Profile
Greek Basket League Profile 
AEK Athens Profile

1983 births
Living people
AEK B.C. players
A.E.L. 1964 B.C. players
Aigaleo B.C. players
Doxa Lefkadas B.C. players
Greek men's basketball players
Greek Basket League players
K.A.O.D. B.C. players
Kastorias B.C. players
Olympias Patras B.C. players
Panelefsiniakos B.C. players
Panionios B.C. players
Point guards
Rethymno B.C. players